The 2022 Coastal Carolina Chanticleers softball team represented Coastal Carolina University during the 2022 NCAA Division I softball season. The Chanticleers played their home games at St. John Stadium – Charles Wade-John Lott Field. The Chanticleers were led by thirteenth-year head coach Kelley Green and were members of the Sun Belt Conference.

Preseason

Sun Belt Conference Coaches Poll
The Sun Belt Conference Coaches Poll was released on January 31, 2022. Coastal Carolina was picked to finish seventh in the conference with 37 votes.

Preseason All-Sun Belt team

Olivia Lackie (USA, Pitcher)
Leanna Johnson (TROY, Pitcher)
Kandra Lamb (LA, Pitcher)
Jessica Mullins (TXST, Pitcher)
Kamdyn Kvistad (USA, Catcher)
Sophie Piskos (LA, Catcher)
Faith Shirley (GASO, 1st Base)
Kelly Horne (TROY, 2nd Base)
Daisy Hess (GSU, Shortstop)
Sara Vanderford (TXST, 3rd Base)
Iyanla De Jesus (CCU, Designated Player)
Raina O'Neal (LA, Outfielder)
Mackenzie Brasher (USA, Outfielder)
Emily Brown (GSU, Outfielder)
Jade Sinness (TROY, Outfielder)

National Softball Signing Day

Personnel

Schedule and results

Schedule Source:
*Rankings are based on the team's current ranking in the NFCA/USA Softball poll.

References

Coastal Carolina
Coastal Carolina softball
Coastal Carolina Chanticleers softball seasons